Jhonata Varela da Silva (born 4 July 2000), commonly known as Jhonata Varela, is a Brazilian professional footballer who plays as a defensive midfielder and left-back for Campeonato Brasileiro Série A club Grêmio.

Club career

Grêmio
Born in Natal, Brazil, Jhonata Varela joined the Grêmio's Academy at the age of 16 in 2017.

Career statistics

Club

Honours
Grêmio
Campeonato Gaúcho: 2021
Recopa Gaúcha: 2021, 2022

References

External links

Jhonata Varela at the Grêmio F.B.P.A.

2000 births
Living people
People from Natal, Rio Grande do Norte
Brazilian footballers
Association football midfielders
Campeonato Brasileiro Série B players
ABC Futebol Clube players
Grêmio Foot-Ball Porto Alegrense players
Sportspeople from Rio Grande do Norte